Askern Miners Football Club is a football club based in Askern, Doncaster, South Yorkshire, England.

History
The club was established as Askern Welfare in 1924, playing in local Doncaster leagues for several decades. In 1967 Welfare won the Doncaster & District Senior League title for the only time in the club's history. In 1992 they finished as runners-up and chose to take promotion to the Central Midlands Football League (CMFL), joining the Premier Division. They won promotion to the Supreme Division in 2001, and in 2008 the club won the CMFL Supreme Division title.

Winning the CMFL earned the club promotion to the Northern Counties East League (NCEL), and they changed their name to Askern Villa. In their first NCEL campaign Askern finished third in Division One, just falling short of winning promotion to the Premier Division. They made their FA Vase debut in 2010 and made their one and only appearance in the FA Cup a year later, losing to Thackley in the Extra Preliminary Round.

In 2013 the club finished bottom of the NCEL Division One, conceding a league record 173 goals. They were relegated back to the Central Midlands League and changed their name again, this time to Askern. In their first season back in the CMFL, Askern finished second bottom of the North Division. In 2020, the club was renamed as Askern Miners FC and re-joined the Doncaster Saturday League.

On the 13 May 2022, the club announced a merger with at-the-time Northern Counties East League Division One side F.C. Humber United, after the latter side were left looking for a new, "permanent home". This decision was reversed, however, on the 31 May 2022, after a decision made by the FA Leagues Committee that the merger cannot go ahead.

Season-by-season record

Notable former players
Players that have played in the Football League either before or after playing for Askern –

 Morgan Hunt

Ground
The club plays at the Welfare Ground, on Doncaster Road, Askern, postcode DN6 0AJ.

Gallery

Honours

League
Central Midlands League Supreme Division
Champions: 2007–08
Central Midlands League Premier Division
Promoted: 2005–06
Doncaster & District Senior League
Champions: 1955–56, 1966–67

Cup
Doncaster FA Challenge Cup
Winners: 1987–88, 1988–89, 2005–06, 2006–07, 2007–08
South Elmsall Challenge Cup
Winners: 1933–34, 1935–36
Runners-up: 1934–35

Records
Best League performance: 3rd in Northern Counties East League Division One, 2008–09
Best FA Cup performance: Extra Preliminary Round, 2011–12
Best FA Vase performance: 3rd Round, 2011–12
Record attendance: 865 vs. Doncaster Rovers, pre-season friendly, 2010–11

References

External links

Football clubs in England
Football clubs in South Yorkshire
1924 establishments in England
Association football clubs established in 1924
Sport in Doncaster
Doncaster & District Senior League
Central Midlands Football League
Northern Counties East Football League
Askern
Mining association football teams in England